Miss World America 2015 was the 7th edition of the Miss World America pageant held on July 3, 2015 at the Auditorium of the University of the District of Columbia, Washington, D.C. Elizabeth Safrit of North Carolina, who was also Miss United States 2014 and the 2nd runner-up in Miss World 2014, crowned her successor at the end of the event. All fifty states, the District of Columbia, and American Samoa competed for the crown. The winner was Victoria Mendoza from Arizona, and she represented the United States in Miss World 2015 pageant on December 19 in Sanya, China.

Results

Order of announcement

Top 22
 First Group

 Ohio 
 Missouri
 Kansas
 New Mexico
 Nebraska
 Delaware
 New York
 Hawaii
 Oklahoma
 Massachusetts 
 Illinois

 Second Group

 Kentucky
 Texas
 Arizona
 California
 Alabama
 Florida
 Washington
 Alaska
 Virginia 
 Maryland
 Louisiana

Top 12

 Missouri
 Louisiana
 Virginia
 Arizona
 Texas
 Nebraska
 Delaware
 Maryland
 Kansas
 Illinois
 Florida
 Massachusetts

Top 5

 Texas
 Nebraska
 Louisiana
 Arizona
 Virginia

Challenge events

Beauty with a Purpose

Judges Interview

Media Interview

Fitness

Top Model

Beachwear

Evening Gown

Multimedia

Introduction Video

Most Photogenic

People's Choice

Miss Congeniality

Judges
Final Judges:
 Edwin Toledo
 Lamont Easter
 Terri Bunch
 Jayne Wood
 Carolyn Watson
 Robert York
 Jeff Cohen
 Janice McQueen Ward
 Lisa Gandara
 Elaine Espinola Keltz
 Emily Gonzagar
 Elena Maximova
 Joseph Han
 Werner Wessels

Contestants
51 delegates have been confirmed:

Other pageant notes

Withdrawals 
: Kaylynn Keller
Because they already compete at Miss World, none of them sent a delegate to the pageant.

Replacement
: Breshell Hurley replaced Megan Retzko, who resigned due to personal reasons.
: Delia Lubanovici replaced Trinity Shaffer, who resigned due to personal reasons.

Crossovers
Contestants who previously competed  at other beauty pageants:
Miss World America
2016: : Maude Gorman
2016: : Amara Berry
2016: : Rachel White (Top 12)

Miss America
2011: : Teresa Scanlan (Winner)
2014: : Ivana Hall (Top 10)

Miss USA
2011: : Erza Haliti
2014: : Carlyn Bradarich (5th runner-up)

2014: : Kristy Landers Niedenfuer (Top 20)

2014: : Arielle Rosmarino (Top 20)
2017: : Catherine Carmichael
2017: : Ashley Mora
2019: : Kailyn Perez (Top 15)

Miss Teen USA
2008: : Chelsie Folden
2014: : Corrin Stellakis

Miss Earth United States
2016: : Corrin Stellakis (Winner)

2020: : Shannon Lynch (Miss Earth USA Air/1st runner-up)

Miss Earth
2016: : Corrin Stellakis (Top 8 then 4th Runner-Up/Miss Earth Fire, as )
2019: : Talisha White (as )

Miss United States
2014: : Shannon Lynch
2014: : Chelsie Folden (Top 16)
2014: : Rachel White (Top 16)
2011: : Mariel Lane (3rd runner-up)
https://www.youtube.com/watch?v=VHUIipgIsaQ    https://www.youtube.com/watch?v=nGpXMnvSr-M

Miss Teen United States
2014: : Bailey Pereira (3rd runner-up)
2014: : Bianca Gaden
2010: : Mariel Lane (1st runner-up)

References

External links
Miss World Official Website
Miss World America Official Website
Miss World United States Official Page

2015 in the United States
World America
2015
2015 in Washington, D.C.